Events from the year 1447 in England.

Incumbents
 Monarch – Henry VI
 Lord Chancellor – John Stafford
 Lord Privy Seal – Andrew Holes

Events
 18 February – Humphrey, Duke of Gloucester is arrested for treason. He dies five days later.
 9 December – Richard, Duke of York is appointed as the King's representative in Ireland.
 Unknown – Wye College is founded in Kent.

Births
 Richard Nykke, bishop (died 1535)
 Lionel Woodville, bishop (died 1484)

Deaths
 Humphrey, Duke of Gloucester (born 1390)
  Henry Beaufort, Cardinal, Lord Chancellor (born 1377)
 John Holland, 2nd Duke of Exeter (born 1395)

 
Years of the 15th century in England